Cyrtarachne ixoides is an orb-weaver spider species (family Araneidae) found in the Mediterranean basin to Georgia and also in Madagascar.

References

External links 

Araneidae
Spiders of Georgia (country)
Spiders of Europe
Spiders of Madagascar
Spiders described in 1870